Peter Thiede (born 13 February 1968 in Ueckermünde, Bezirk Neubrandenburg) is a German rowing cox.

References 
 
 

1968 births
Living people
People from Ueckermünde
People from Bezirk Neubrandenburg
German male rowers
Sportspeople from Mecklenburg-Western Pomerania
Coxswains (rowing)
Olympic rowers of Germany
Rowers at the 1992 Summer Olympics
Rowers at the 1996 Summer Olympics
Rowers at the 2004 Summer Olympics
Rowers at the 2008 Summer Olympics
Olympic silver medalists for Germany
Olympic medalists in rowing
Medalists at the 1996 Summer Olympics
World Rowing Championships medalists for East Germany
World Rowing Championships medalists for Germany